George Albert Guertin (February 17, 1869 – August 6, 1931) was an American prelate of the Roman Catholic Church.  He served as bishop of the Diocese of Manchester in New Hampshire from 1907 to 1931.  Guertin was the first native of New Hampshire and the first French Canadian to be appointed as bishop in the United States. He is the namesake for Bishop Guertin High School

Biography

Early life 
George Albert Guertin was born on February 12, 1869, in Nashua, New Hampshire.  He was the son of George Guertin and Louis Lefebvre Guertin, both of French-Canadian descent. The younger George Guertin attended publish school in Nashua, then entered the new parochial school at St. Aloysuis Parish.

Guertin first attended St. Charles College in Sherbrooke, Quebec, then enrolled at St. Hyacinthe College in Saint-Hyacinthe, Quebec. Bishop Denis Bradley then sent Guertin to study theology at St. John's Seminary in Boston, Massachusetts; he was the first graduate of St. John's to become a bishop.

Priesthood 
Guertin was ordained to the priesthood for the Diocese of Manchester by Bishop Bradley on December 17, 1892.  After his ordination, he served as a curate at St. Augustine Parish in Manchester, New Hampshire. Three years and four months later, Guertin was transferred to Sacred Heart Parish in Lebanon, New Hampshire. Guertin was appointed in 1901 as pastor of St. Anthony's Church in Manchester.

Bishop of Manchester 
On January 2, 1907, Guertin was appointed the third bishop of the Diocese of Manchester by Pope Pius X. He received his episcopal consecration on March 19, 1907, from Archbishop Diomede Falconio, with Bishops Matthew Harkins and Michael Tierney serving as co-consecrators. After his consecration, Guertin moved into the rectory at the cathedral and promised parishioners there that the parish would remain an English-speaking one.  Between 1907 and 1926, Guertin added sixteen new parishes in the diocese; five were French-speaking and two were Polish-speaking.  During World War I, Guertin had the diocese purchase a $15,000 war bond;  he purchased out of his own funds $5 war saving stamps for each student in the cathedral parish school.

After the war, the U.S. Government began a push to "Americanize" schools by making English the language of instruction. Guertin approved a State of New Hampshire plan to institute this policy in schools operated by the diocese. However, this plan caused deep anger among French Canadians in the diocese trying to preserve their cultural heritage.

In November 1922, Guertin attempted to mediate a labor dispute in Manchester between the workers at textile mills run by Amoskeag Manufacturing Company and its management.  However, company management turned down Guertin's proposal.

In September 1930, Guertin issued a degree stating that Catholic parents in the diocese must send their children to Catholic schools or be denied absolution.

George Guertin died from diabetes in Morristown, New Jersey at the Psychiatric Institute on August 6, 1931, at age 62.

References 

1869 births
1931 deaths
Saint John's Seminary (Massachusetts) alumni
People from Nashua, New Hampshire
Roman Catholic bishops of Manchester
20th-century Roman Catholic bishops in the United States
American people of French-Canadian descent